The Southern Railway (abbreviated SR), headquartered at Chennai, is one of the 19 zones of Indian Railways. It is the earliest of the 19 zones of the Indian Railways created in independent India. It was created on 14 April 1951 by merging three state railways, namely, the Madras and Southern Mahratta Railway, the South Indian Railway Company, and the Mysore State Railway. The South Indian Railway was originally created in the British colonial times as Great Southern of India Railway Co founded in Britain in 1853 and registered in 1859. Its original headquarters was in Tiruchirappalli (Trichy) and was registered as a company in London only in 1890. At present, after re-organization of existing railway zones and creation of new zones undertaken by the Indian Railways between 2002 and 2003, Southern Railway has emerged as the 4th largest zone after undertaking some gauge conversion projects and creation of new lines. The trains operated by the southern railway are rated the cleanest as well as cleanly maintained trains of the Indian Railways.

History

In 1944, all Railway companies were taken over by the Government. And three years later, when India woke up to independence in 1947, the stage was set for the integration of different Railways into smaller zones. In 1948, immediately after independence, there were as many as 42 different railway systems – a multiplicity of railway administrations, varying in size and standards.

The regrouping proposals put forward by the various committees were studied in great detail to ensure that a unification could be achieved with the least disturbance and dislocation. Important associations of railway-users, Chambers of Commerce and Industry, the State Governments and acknowledged experts both in India and abroad were fully consulted.

N. Gopalaswami Ayyangar, the then Minister for Railways, was the principal architect of the regrouping of Indian Railways. In December 1950, the Central Advisory Committee for Railways approved the plan for Indian Railways into six Zonal systems, namely, the Northern, the North-Eastern, the Southern, the Central, the Eastern and the Western.

The Southern Railway zone  was the first zone to be formed. Created on 14 April 1951 by the merger of the Madras and Southern Mahratta Railway, the South Indian Railway and the Mysore State Railway, the economic and geographical factors of this zone facilitated an early integrated network. This amalgamation was a major step towards streamlining and organizing the working pattern of the Railway system. The Railway Press at Royapuram was expanded during 1957.

K. R. Ramanujam was appointed the first General Manager of the newly formed Southern Railways.

Divisional system of working on the Southern Railway was introduced in stages, and the dates on which the various Divisions started working are given below:

Organisation
The Southern Railway is headed by the General Manager, assisted by an Additional General Manager.

Divisions
Southern Railway has its headquarters in Chennai and has the following six divisions:

 Chennai railway division
 Trichy railway division
 Madurai railway division
 Palakkad railway division
 Salem railway division
 Thiruvananthapuram railway division
 Podanur railway division (functional till 1956 later transferred to Palakkad Division)

Jurisdiction

It covers the states of Tamil Nadu, Kerala, Puducherry and small portions of Andhra Pradesh and Karnataka. More than 50 crore passengers travel on the network every year. Andaman and Nicobar areas also to be covered under the new railway project sanctioned for Andaman and Nicobar Islands.

Operations 
The zone operates both passenger and freight trains. The A1 graded stations of the zone are Chennai Central, Chennai Egmore, Ernakulam Junction, Thiruvananthapuram Central, Coimbatore junction, Madurai Junction, Kozhikode and Thrissur. Other major stations of the zone includes  Trichy, Salem,  Tirunelveli,  Tambaram,  Erode, Ernakulam Town, Aluva, Thanjavur junction, Arakkonam Junction, Katpadi, Mangalore Central, Mangalore Jn., Kumbakonam, Dindigul, Palakkad Junction, Shoranur Junction, Viluppuram, Alappuzha, Kottayam, Thiruvananthapuram Kochuveli, Nagercoil Junction, Kanniyakumari, Jolarpettai Junction, Kollam Junction, Karur, Pollachi Junction, Thalassery, Kannur, Puducherry,  Tiruvallur, Perambur and Avadi. Passenger trains range from day intercity trains to overnight trains, long-distance trains to other zones, Shatabdi and passenger trains stopping at many stations. The zone owns a large number of coaches. These are maintained at coach care centres. Basin Bridge coach care centre serving Chennai central is one of the biggest in the country. Most major stations have a coach care Centre. The stations which don't have such facilities are served by trains through sometimes complex rake-sharing arrangements which also increases the utilization of the coaches. Apart from these Centres, the zone has MEMU and DEMU car sheds. These are available in Avadi, Trichy, Erode, Palakkad and Kollam. The zone also operates suburban system in Chennai.

Freight operations mainly include container traffic from all the ports falling under its jurisdiction (Chennai, Ennore, Kochi, Mangaluru and Thoothukkudi are some of the major ports) and coal-traffic bound to the thermal power stations in Tamil Nadu state from the ports. Public sector oil companies also transport petroleum products from refineries to storage terminals using the zone. Cement plants also use the railway system extensively. Food grains are also transported through freight trains. Most of the lines inside ports, thermal stations, manufacturing industries and owned by the respective companies and the zone provides a link connecting its network and the wagons and locomotives. There is a wagon care centre in Tondiarpet, Chennai.

The zone has electric loco sheds at Royapuram, Erode and Arakkonam. Diesel loco sheds are present at Tondiarpet, Golden Rock, Ernakulam and Erode.  Most of the important routes are electrified and only low traffic lines are unelectrified. However, it is common to see diesel locos in electrified lines due to various operational constraints. It is also common to see other zones' locomotives operating inside the zone and vice versa.

Since the zone has little freight traffic compared to other zones and huge passenger traffic (which are run at low fares across the country), the zones' finances are often in a bad shape.

Mangalore, Salem, Katpadi and Chennai acts as the first category entry/exit points of southern railway zone from other nearby railway zones due to this all trains make a technical halt at these stations to make a crew change. Jolarpettai and Arakonam acts as the second category entry/exit points of the zone.

Junction railway stations in this zone are listed below.

 Erode Junction
 Salem Junction
 Karur Junction
 Omalur Junction
 Jolarpettai Junction
 Katpadi Junction
 Walajah Road Junction
 Villuppuram Junction
 Arakkonam Junction
 Chengalpattu Junction
 Vriddhachchalam Junction
 Tiruchchirappalli Junction
 Cuddalore Port Junction
 Mayladuthurai Junction
 Thanjavur Junction
 Tiruvarur Junction
 Nagapattinam Junction
 Nidamangalam Junction
 Nagercoil Junction
 Tirunelveli Junction
 Tenkasi Junction
 Maniyachchi Junction
 Virudhunagar Junction
 Madurai Junction
 Manamadurai Junction
 Karaikkudi Junction
 Dindigul Junction
 Pollachchi Junction
 Podanur Junction
 Coimbatore Junction
 Coimbatore North Junction
 Irugur Junction
 Mangalore Junction
 Shoranur Junction
 Palakkad Junction
 Thirssur Punkunnam Junction
 Ernakulam Junction
 Kayankulam Junction
 Kollam Junction
 Peralam Junction
 Tiruturaipundi Junction
 Villivakkam Junction
 Basin Bridge Junction
 Pattabiram Junction

Terminal railway stations in this zone are listed below.

 Chennai Central Railway Station
 Chennai Beach
 Ranippet
 Chennai Central Suburban Terminal
 Chennai Egmore
 Mettupalayam
 Mangalore central
 Thiruvananthapuram Central
 Thiruvananthapuram Kochuveli
 Nilambur Road
 Guruvayur
 Cochin Harbour Terminus
 Kanniyakumari
 Tiruchendur
 Thoothukudi
 Rameshwaram
 Bodi Nayakkanur
 Mannargudi
 Velankanni
 Point Calimere
 Tranquebar
 Puducherry
 Mettur
 Udhagamandalam (Ooty)
 Pattabiramam East depot
 Anna Nagar West

Infrastructure

Assets 

Southern Railway has many factories and sheds:
 Mechanical Workshops
 Carriage, Wagon and Loco Works, Perambur, Chennai
 Central Workshop, Ponmalai, Tiruchirapalli
 Engineering Work Shop, Arakkonam
 Signal & Telecommunication Workshop
 Southern Railway Signal & Telecom Workshop, Podanur, Coimbatore
 Sheds
 Locomotive Sheds
 Diesel
 Diesel Loco Shed, Golden Rock, Tiruchirapalli
 Diesel Loco Shed, Tondiarpet, Chennai
 Diesel Loco Shed, Erode
 Diesel Loco Shed, Ernakulam
 Electrical
 Electrical Loco Shed, Arakkonam
 Electrical Loco Shed, Erode
 Electrical Loco Shed, Royapuram, Chennai
 Steam Loco Shed
 Coonoor, The Nilgiris
 Defunct Loco sheds
 Kollam (Quilon) Steam Loco Shed
 Shoranur Steam Loco Shed
 Egmore Meter Gauge Electric Loco Shed
 Thiruvarur Meter Gauge Diesel Loco Shed
 Sengottai Meter Gauge Diesel Loce Shed (Makeshift shed to handle Meter gauge Locos in South Tamilnadu).
 Jolarpettai Diesel Loco Shed
 MEMU Car Shed
 MEMU Car Shed, Kollam
 MEMU Car Shed, Palakkad
 EMU Car Shed
 EMU Car Shed, Avadi 
 EMU Car Shed, Tambaram
 EMU Car Shed, Velachery
 BG Coaching Maintenance Depots
 Basin Bridge, Chennai
 GSN Yard Egmore, Chennai
 Madurai Junction
 Salem
 Erode Junction
 Coimbatore
 Mettupalayam
 Shoranur
 Thiruvananthapuram
 Ernakulam
 Alappuzha
 Mangalore Central
 Tirunelveli
 Nagercoil
 Rameswaram
 Thoothukudi
 Tiruchirapalli
 Viluppuram
 Tambaram
 Wagon Maintenance Depots
 Tondiarpet, Chennai
 Egmore, Chennai
 Madurai
 Jolarpettai
 Kochi Harbour
 Arakkonam Junction
 Royapuram, Chennai
 Pattibiram Military Siding
 Erode
 Mangalore junction
 Ernakulam
 Milavittan
 Irumpanam
 Tiruchirapalli
 Viluppuram
 Uthagamandalam
 Printing Presses
 General Printing Press, Royapuram, Chennai
 Ticket Printing Factory, Thiruvananthapuram,
 Ticket Printing Factory, Tiruchirappalli

Rail transport

Surveys

New lines

Gauge conversion

Doubling

New line survey

Unused lines

Railway Lines Existed during Colonial India which no longer exist today

Loco sheds
 Electric Loco Shed, Arakkonam
 Electric Loco Shed, Erode
 Electric Loco Shed, Royapuram
 Diesel Loco Shed, Ernakulam
 Diesel Loco Shed, Erode
 Diesel Loco Shed, Golden Rock
 Diesel Loco Shed, Tondiarpet
 Steam Loco Shed, Coonoor

See also

 Zones and divisions of Indian Railways
 All India Station Masters' Association (AISMA)

References

External links

 Southern Railway official website

1951 establishments in Madras State
Zones of Indian Railways